The Dzus fastener, also known as a turnlock fastener or quick-action panel fastener, is a type of proprietary quarter-turn spiral cam lock fastener often used to secure skin panels on aircraft and other high-performance vehicles. It is named after its inventor William Dzus.

History 

The fastener was invented and patented by an American engineer of Ukrainian descent William Dzus in the early 1930s.

Operation 

The cowling (10) and fuselage (11) can be quickly fastened together by bringing the cowling (10) to the fuselage (11), placing the shank (13) of the button (12) into the hole in the fuselage (25). The button (12) is turned by a screwdriver in its slot (21) to a position in which the slots (16) will hold the spring (22). As button (12) turns, the walls of its spiral slots (16) act as cams, and pull the intermediate section of the spring (22) from its relaxed position up into the slot's holes (18) past the slot's projections (17). The projection (17) in the slots (16) will resist reverse rotation of the button (12) and thus prevent unintentional separation of the cowling (10) and fuselage (11) from vibration. Optionally, to prevent noise, strips of felt or rubber (26) may be between the cowling (10) and fuselage (11).

To unfasten the cowling (10) from the fuselage (11) turn the button (12) one-quarter of a turn. This will disengage the button (12) from the spring (22). The holes (18) are large-enough to allow the spring (22) to clear the projection (17) either while engaging the button (12) or disengaging it.  The end of the shank (13) that has the slots (16) must be well-rounded so spring (22) can easily enter its slots (16).

The Dzus fastener's removable part is a button (12) that can turn if a screwdriver is placed in the slot (21) of its head (14). The button (12) is held to the cowling (10) by its head (14) and a groove (19). The groove assures that the button (12) does not fall off the cowling (10) when the cowling is unfastened. The hole (25) includes a finish or material so that the button (12) does not bind when turned.

The stationary part of the Dzus fastener has a spring (22) with coils (23) riveted (24) to the fuselage (11). The part of the spring (22) between the rivets is arched.

The button's shank (13) has a tubular bore (15) opposite the head (14). The shank (13) has spiral bayonet slots (16) opposite each to other to receive the spring (22) of the stationary part of the fastener. When fastened, the slots (16) provide holes (18) that surround and hold the stationary spring (22). A projection (17) in the slots (16) holds the fastener closed by pressing the head (14) against the cowling (10) toward the spring (22) fastened to the fuselage (11).

One common improvement places the female parts in a small bucket to reduce entry of water. Another is to make it easier to open and close: For example, many modern Dzus fasteners use self-centering screw-drivers. Other improvements reduce the cost. For example, changing the spring so it can be secured to the female hole avoids the cost of rivets. Some manufacturers die-cast the button rather than machining it.

Uses 

Dzus fasteners are also used to secure plates, doors, and panels that require frequent removal for inspection and servicing.  These fasteners are notable in that they are of an "over-centre" design, requiring positive sustained torque to unfasten. Thus, any minor disturbance to the fastener (e.g. vibration) will tend to correct itself rather than proceed to further loosening as it would in threaded fasteners.

Turnlock fasteners are available in several different styles and are usually referred to by the manufacturer's trade name. Some of the most common are DZUS, Camloc, and Airloc.

References

External links 

 DZUS fastener 
 Data Sheet - DZUS Standard Line Quarter-Turn Fasteners
 Tests on Dzus Self-Locking Fasteners – Aero Digest

Fasteners